Jarmila Jurkovičová (née Klimešová, ; born 9 February 1981 in Šumperk) is a female javelin thrower from the Czech Republic. Her personal best throw is 62.60 metres, achieved in June 2006 in Prague.

She won the 2000 World Junior Championships. She later competed at the 2003 World Championships, the 2004 Olympic Games, the 2006 European Championships, the 2008 Olympic Games and the 2012 Olympic Games without reaching the final.

International competitions

References
 
 

1981 births
Living people
People from Šumperk
Czech female javelin throwers
Olympic athletes of the Czech Republic
Athletes (track and field) at the 2004 Summer Olympics
Athletes (track and field) at the 2008 Summer Olympics
Athletes (track and field) at the 2012 Summer Olympics
World Athletics Championships athletes for the Czech Republic
Sportspeople from the Olomouc Region
21st-century Czech women
20th-century Czech women